The Pierce Site (also known as Pierce Mounds and Middens and 8FR14, and other numbers)  is a Pre-Columbian archaeological site in Apalachicola, Florida. It is located approximately 1 mile northwest of Apalachicola on 12th Street. On January 11, 1974, it was added to the U.S. National Register of Historic Places. It was occupied during the Middle Woodland Period, which includes ceramics of early Weeden Island and Swift Creek types. It also was occupied during the late prehistoric Fort Walton Period.

References

External links
 Franklin County listings at National Register of Historic Places
 Franklin County listings at Florida's Office of Cultural and Historical Programs

Swift Creek culture
Mounds in Florida
Native American history of Florida
Geography of Franklin County, Florida
Archaeological sites on the National Register of Historic Places in Florida
Apalachicola, Florida
National Register of Historic Places in Franklin County, Florida